Kinuko (written: 絹子) is a feminine Japanese given name. Notable people with the name include:

, Japanese volleyball player
Kinuko Y. Craft (born 1940), Japanese-born American painter and illustrator
, Japanese painter
Kinuko Ito, Japanese beauty queen

Japanese feminine given names